Sérgio Oliveira (born 1992) is a Portuguese football midfielder.

Sérgio Oliveira may also refer to:
 Sérgio Oliveira (judoka) (born 1967), Brazilian judoka
 Sérgio Pacheco de Oliveira (born 1981), Brazilian football midfielder